The 2007 Turkish Grand Prix (officially the 2007 Formula 1 Petrol Ofisi Turkish Grand Prix) was the twelfth race of the 2007 FIA Formula One World Championship. Won by Felipe Massa, it was held on 26 August 2007 at the Istanbul Park in Tuzla. It was the third time a Formula One race had been held here. The two previous winners of the race were Kimi Räikkönen in 2005 and Massa in 2006, both of whom race for Ferrari in 2007.

It came following considerable controversy after the 2006 event, where the organisers were fined $5,000,000 for political bias, due to their choice of Mehmet Ali Talat to present the winner's trophy. Talat is President of the Turkish Cypriot state, which is not an internationally recognised government. This was seen by the governing body of Formula One as having compromised their neutrality.

Lewis Hamilton came into the race with a 7-point lead over McLaren teammate Fernando Alonso after Hamilton's controversial victory in the 2007 Hungarian Grand Prix. McLaren led Ferrari in the constructors' championship by 19 points despite not being allowed to score points in Hungary. However, the Ferrari had looked strong in recent weeks, and their two cars ultimately dominated the race from start to finish, Massa and Räikkönen taking first and second places respectively.   A late puncture dropped Hamilton to fifth place and cut his championship lead over Alonso to five points.

During the press conference following the race, Massa commented that "the Istanbul Park was the track where he made his career turn-around, and finally began winning races." He also praised the track as well as the city.

Report

Race
Felipe Massa's Ferrari led from pole from teammate Kimi Räikkönen who had jumped McLaren's Lewis Hamilton off the grid to take second place. Reigning World Champion Fernando Alonso's start from fourth was even worse than teammate Hamilton's as he fell behind both BMW Saubers of Robert Kubica and Nick Heidfeld into sixth. However, BMW's early stopping strategy led to Alonso taking both places back after the first round of pit-stops.
At the first round of stops it seemed that Räikkönen could pass Massa if he stopped later, as he did at the French Grand Prix. However, Massa stopped after Räikkönen to retain the lead. Hamilton stopped later than both Ferraris and caught several seconds up to them, but could not pass Räikkönen for second, as he gradually fell away. Meanwhile, Kubica's strategy had not only dropped him behind Heidfeld and Alonso, but Renault's Heikki Kovalainen too.
Massa stopped later than Räikkönen again at the second pit stop, and therefore retained the lead as Ferrari called the race between teammates off at this point. Hamilton may have emerged ahead of Räikkönen, but a puncture in his front tyre dropped him to fifth behind Heidfeld and Alonso. Damage to his front wing led to Kovalainen catching him, but the Finn was unable to pass Hamilton. Kubica lost a place to Nico Rosberg through strategy finishing eighth.
Massa eventually won his second consecutive Turkish Grand Prix, and his fifth Grand Prix win overall, all of which came from pole position. He had secured his eighth pole in qualifying.
Mark Webber of Red Bull Racing was the only non-classified car, with a hydraulic failure. All the rest were classified including Adrian Sutil who retired with a fuel pressure problem. Scuderia Toro Rosso driver Vitantonio Liuzzi ended a run of 9 consecutive retirements stretching back to the Bahrain Grand Prix in April.

Classification

Qualifying

Notes
 – Rubens Barrichello was given a ten-place grid penalty for an engine change before the race.
 – Jenson Button was given a ten-place grid penalty for an engine change after qualifying.

Race

Championship standings after the race 

Drivers' Championship standings

Constructors' Championship standings

 Note: Only the top five positions are included for both sets of standings.
 Bold text indicates competitors who still had a theoretical chance of becoming World Champion.

See also 
 2007 Istanbul Park GP2 Series round

References

External links

 Detailed Turkish Grand Prix results

Turkish Grand Prix
Turkish Grand Prix
Grand Prix
August 2007 sports events in Turkey